Tam Hòa is a commune located in Núi Thành district of Quảng Nam province, Vietnam. It has an area of about 24.12km2 and the population in 2019 was 9,028.

References